NFESC, the Naval Facilities Engineering Service Center (Formerly NCEL, Naval Civil Engineering Laboratory) in Port Hueneme, California, provides engineering services, technology testing, specialized facilities, and expertise in these facilities. The organization is centered on a primary customer: the United States federal government, specifically branches of the Department of Defense, the Navy, and the Marine Corps, although it does conduct business with a variety of other government and private organizations.

Origin
NFESC was established October 1, 1993 from the remains of several other similar organizations, one of which was NCEL. The NFESC workforce included former NCEL employees represented by National Association of Government Employees, and unrepresented employees of other Navy entities.

References 

Organizations based in Ventura County, California
United States military associations
1993 establishments in California